FC Bistrița was a Romanian football team from Bistrița, founded in 2013 and dissolved in 2017.

History
After founding, the club entered in the Liga V Bistrița-Năsăud County and after one season they won it and promoted to Liga IV Bistrița-Năsăud County. After only two seasons at this level, FC Bistrița won the championship and qualified for the 2015–16 Liga IV promotion play-off, where after a highly disputed double against Suceava County champion, they managed to promote to Liga III.

In Liga III the club encountered serious financial problems, and shortly after the start of the second part of the championship it withdrew and then was dissolved.

Stadium

At the beginning the club played its home matches on IPROEB Stadium, in Bistrița. After the dissolution of Gloria Bistrița in 2015, they moved on Jean Pădureanu Stadium and shared the stadium with Academia Gloria, one of the successors of the old club, until 2017 when FC Bistrița was dissolved.

Honours
Liga IV – Bistrița-Năsăud County
Winners (1): 2015–16
Liga V – Bistrița-Năsăud County
Winners (1): 2013–14

References

External links
 Official website 
 Team profile on AJF Bistrița-Năsăud 

Association football clubs established in 2013
Association football clubs disestablished in 2017
Defunct football clubs in Romania
Football clubs in Bistrița-Năsăud County
Sport in Bistrița
Liga III clubs
Liga IV clubs
2013 establishments in Romania
2017 disestablishments in Romania